Yayvantepe is a village in the Midyat District of Mardin Province in Turkey. The village is populated by Kurds of the Bêcirmanî tribe and by Arabs. The Arab population should not be mistaken for the Mhallami who are numerous in the district.

It had a population of 998 in 2021 and is located southwest of the Mor Gabriel Monastery.

References 

Villages in Midyat District
Kurdish settlements in Mardin Province
Arab settlements in Mardin Province